This is a list of current office holder of various fields of the Government of India.

Constitutional Office-Holders

Cabinet Office-Holders

Important office holders

Heads of commissions

Heads of financial bodies

Defence and Security

Notes

See also
Indian order of precedence
Gazetted Officer

References

India
India